Riveris is a municipality in the Trier-Saarburg district, in Rhineland-Palatinate, Germany. The village lies in the valley of the river Riveris.

References

Trier-Saarburg